Minuscule 913 (in the Gregory-Aland numbering), α 470 (von Soden), is a 14th-century Greek minuscule manuscript of the New Testament on parchment.

Description 

The codex contains the text of the Book of Acts, Pauline epistles, and Catholic epistles, on 244 parchment leaves (size ) with some lacunae. It lacks texts of the Acts 2:36-3:24 and Jude 20-25.

The text is written in one column per page, and 22 lines per page.

The text is divided according to chapters, whose numbers are given at the margin, and their titles at the top of the pages.

Text 
Kurt Aland the Greek text of the codex did not place in any Category.
Its textual character is unknown.

History 

According to Scrivener and C. R. Gregory the manuscript was written in the 14th century. Currently the manuscript is dated by the INTF to the 14th century.

It was bought by Dean Burgon. In 1893 it was obtained for the British Museum. C. R. Gregory saw it in 1883.

The manuscript was added to the list of New Testament manuscripts by Scrivener (223a, 262p) and Gregory (229a, 248p). In 1908 Gregory gave the number 913 to it.

It is currently housed in the British Library (Egerton MS 2787) in London.

See also 

 List of New Testament minuscules
 Minuscule 912
 Biblical manuscript
 Textual criticism

References

Further reading

External links 
 

Greek New Testament minuscules
14th-century biblical manuscripts